Charlotte Lucy "Charlie" Estcourt (born 27 May 1998) is a footballer who plays as a midfielder in the FA Women's Championship for Birmingham City. and the Wales national team and most recently for FA WSL club Reading. Estcourt was named Football Association of Wales (FAW) Young Player of the Year in 2015.

Early life
Born in Reading, Berkshire, Estcourt attended the John Madejski Academy, where she studied for A-levels in PE, biology and psychology.

Club career
Estcourt began her career at Reading, joining the club's youth academy at the age of nine. In 2011, Estcourt left the club to join Chelsea but returned to the Royals four years later at the age of 16. 
At the start of the 2016 season, Estcourt joined Bristol City on a short term loan, spending three months at the club where she made 10 appearances scoring twice. When Estcourt returned to Reading, she signed her first professional contract. Estcourt then returned to Bristol on a season long loan for the 2017/18 season. In June 2018 Estcourt signed a two year contract with Reading keeping her at the club until the end of the 2019/20 season. On 8 June 2020, Reading announced that Estcourt had left the club after her contract had expired. In September 2022, it was confirmed Estcourt had joined Birmingham City from Coventry United.

International career
Estcourt made her full international debut on 6 March 2015, at the age of 16, against Bosnia in the Istria Cup. During a European Qualifying match v Israel in September 2016 she scored her first international goal leading to comparisons with the goal scored by Hal Robson Kanu against Belgium in Euro 2016. She has gone on to make 34 senior appearances scoring 3 goals.

Career statistics

Club

International goals
Scores and results list Wales's goal tally first.

Honours
Reading F.C. Women
 
FA WSL 2: 2015:

References

External links
 
 
 

1998 births
Living people
Reading F.C. Women players
Bristol City W.F.C. players
Wales women's international footballers
Welsh women's footballers
Women's Super League players
Women's association football midfielders
Charlton Athletic W.F.C. players
Coventry United W.F.C. players
London Bees players
Women's Championship (England) players